Pozsony county was an administrative county (comitatus) of the Kingdom of Hungary. Its territory is now mostly part of Slovakia, while a small area belongs to Hungary. In 1969, the three villages that remained in Hungary were combined to form Dunasziget.

Its name changed along with that of the city of Pressburg (today's Bratislava). Its names around 1900 were Pozsony vármegye in Hungarian, Prešpurská župa in Slovak and Preßburger Gespanschaft in German.

Geography

 
The county shared borders with the Austrian land of Lower Austria and the Hungarian counties Nyitra, Komárom, Győr and Moson. It was situated between the river Morava in the west, the river Danube in the south, and the river Váh in the east. The southern part of the Little Carpathians divided the county into two. It also covered most of the island known today as Žitný ostrov (Hungarian: Csallóköz) between the Danube and the Little Danube. Its area was 4,370 km2 around 1910.

Seats
The seats of Pozsony county were the Pozsony Castle (present-day Bratislava Castle) and Somorja (present-day Šamorín), and from the 18th century onwards the town of Pressburg.

History
A sort of predecessor to Pozsony county may be existed as early as the 9th century during the time of Great Moravia. After Pozsony county's territory had become part of the Kingdom of Hungary, the Hungarian comitatus was created around 1000 or even earlier. It was one of the first counties created in the Kingdom of Hungary. Its territory comprised roughly what is today Bratislava Region and Trnava Region. Throughout its history it was among the most prosperous territories of Hungary, and until the late 18th century it was particularly advanced and prosperous. In the 18th and 19th century, the population consisted of Germans (mainly in Pressburg and larger towns), Hungarians (mainly in the south, some suburbs of Pressburg, Slovaks (mainly in the north and in the suburbs of Pressburg and Croats (mainly in the suburbs of Pressburg).

In the aftermath of World War I, most of Pozsony county became part of newly formed Czechoslovakia, as recognized by the concerned states in 1920 by the Treaty of Trianon. As Bratislava county, it continued to exist until 1927 in Czechoslovakia, but it had completely different powers and somewhat modified borders. A small part south of the river Danube remained part of Hungary and joined Győr-Moson-Pozsony county.

Following the provisions of the First Vienna Award, the southeastern part of the area (Žitný ostrov, Senec, Galanta) became part of Hungary again in November 1938. The approximate Trianon borders were restored after World War II.

Demographics

Subdivisions

In the early 20th century, the subdivisions of Pozsony county were:

Notes

References

States and territories established in the 11th century
States and territories disestablished in 1920
States and territories disestablished in 1923
Counties in the Kingdom of Hungary
Divided regions